Jan Palfijn (name sometimes spelled Jean Palfyn or Jan Palfyn) (28 November 1650 – 21 April 1730) was a Flemish surgeon and obstetrician who was a native of Kortrijk in the County of Flanders. He practiced medicine in Ypres and Paris, and in 1697 moved to Ghent, where he remained for the rest of his career.

Palfijn is remembered for introducing the obstetrical forceps (Main de Palfijn) into medicine in the early 1720s.  Palfijn's forceps initially had a problem because the two separate halves occasionally shifted during use. Later the two halves of the forceps were linked by a hinge to correct the problem.

In 1718 Palfijn published an influential work for surgeons called l'Anatomie du corps humain (Anatomy of the human body). Reportedly, this book was still in use in Japan in the latter part of the 19th century. The Palfijn Medical Museum, the Jan Palfijn Hospital in Merksem and the Jan Palfijn Hospital in Ghent are named after him.

References
 Article on Palfijn's forceps 
 This article is based on a translation of an article from the French Wikipedia.

1650 births
1730 deaths
Physicians of the Spanish Netherlands
Physicians of the Austrian Netherlands